A'mâk-ı Hayâl ("The Depths of Fantasy"), is the Sufi magnum opus of Ahmad Hilmi of Filibe. A'mâk-ı Hayâl is a novel, the subject of which is the Sufi wahdat al-wujud belief. Ahmad Hilmi, himself, was a strict follower of the wahdat al-wujud.

In the frame story of novel, young Râci, the protagonist, tries to find answers to his questions about life, most of which are mainly ontological problems. He tries to find the answers in science, philosophy and religion. However he can't find any answer that satisfies him. In this point he meets Aynalı Baba, who is a dervish-like Sufi. They meet every day and during their meetings, Râci falls asleep and dreams of fantastic worlds and situations. Each dream or fantasy demonstrates an aspect of Sufi thought, more specifically the wahdat al-wujud.

External links 
"Aşk Defterleri" Beyaz Arif Akbaş,Yalnızgöz Yayınları;2010

Sufi literature